K53 or K-53 may refer to:

 K-53 (Kansas highway)
 K-53 truck, an American military truck
 Junkers K53, a German military trainer aircraft
 Kushiro Station (Hokkaido)
 Potassium-53, an isotope of potassium